Farhadu Suleiman (born 6 November 2000) is a Ghanaian professional footballer who plays as a midfielder for Ghanaian Premier League side Dreams F.C.

Career

Early career
Sulieman played for the youth side of Berekum Chelsea before moving to Dreams FC and joining their youth rank in 2019.

Dreams FC
Suleiman joined Accra-based side Dreams FC in July 2019. He was named on the club's squad list for the 2020–21 Ghana Premier League season in the club's quest for a top position. He made his debut on 20 December 2020, in a 1–0 loss to Kumasi Asante Kotoko. On 31 January 2021, he scored his first professional goal, scoring the equaliser in the 66th minute to help Dreams FC to a 2–2 draw against Elmina Sharks. The following week in a match against West African Football Academy (WAFA) on 3 February 2021, he scored the 1st goal in a 3–0 win. He scored his third goal of the season, in a 2–0 victory over Eleven Wonders the following match day on 7 February 2021, scoring in three successive match days in the process.

References

External links
 

Living people
2000 births
Association football midfielders
Ghanaian footballers
Dreams F.C. (Ghana) players
Ghana Premier League players